Shun Tak-China Travel Ship Management Limited, doing business as TurboJET, is a ferry company based in Hong Kong. The company was established from the joint venture between Shun Tak Holdings and China Travel International Investment Hong Kong in July 1999. It operates hydrofoil ferry services between Hong Kong, Macau, Shenzhen and Zhuhai, in the Pearl River Delta area.

History
Shun Tak and China Travel had their own separate ferry business brands before merging as TurboJET, on 1 July 1999. They were Far East Hydrofoil / Far East Jetfoil by Shun Tak, and Turbo Cat by CTS Parkview Company Ltd.

It acquired New Ferry -Transporte Marítimo de Passageiros Limitada (abbreviated New World First Ferry) from NWS Holdings with 350 million in cash on 11 August 2011, and completed the transaction on 30 September.

Since the opening of HongKong-Macau-Zhuhai Bridge in October 2018, passenger numbers have been falling sharply due to the direct competition. The ferry service was deemed too slow and expensive. Starting 2019 TurboJet started gradually cutting frequencies adjusting to the passenger numbers. The second half of 2019 started the anti-extradition bill protests in Hong Kong, which further reduced movement between the two cities, as well as Mainland-Hong Kong routes.

Routes
TurboJET provides services between Hong Kong, Hong Kong International Airport, Macau, Shenzhen and Guangzhou, all located around the Pearl River Delta in southern China. The route between Hong Kong and Macau is the busiest, operating 24 hours a day, taking approximately one hour to travel the  journey on TurboJET's high speed vessels.

In the past, besides the inter-city routes, Turbo Cat operated Hong Kong out-lying routes during the years 1999 to 2000. The routes were Central to Tuen Mun (on weekdays), and Central to Tai O (on weekends). After the merger, the routes are now operated under the TurboJET brand.

Fleet
TurboJET is the world's largest operator of Boeing's Jetfoils; all used to belong to the former Far East Hydrofoil / Far East Jetfoil. Far East Hydrofoil / Far East Jetfoil also used PS-30 and FoilCat, whereas the former Turbo Cat used FlyingCat and TriCat.

TurboJET's fleet includes seven major types of vessels (and eight minor vessels), with one of the major types (and two minor types) rented from another company.

Bought vessels
FoilCat : 35m length, 561 tonnes, 423 passengers catamaran hydrofoil. Propelled by waterjets powered by twin General Electric LM500 gas turbines. Maximum speed at 50 knots. Built by Norwegian specialists Kvaerner Fjellstrand.
FlyingCat : 40m length, 479 tonnes, 303 passengers catamaran. Propelled by waterjets powered by twin MTU 16V 396 diesel engines, rated at 2000 kW each. Cruising speed at 35 knots. Built by Norwegian specialists Kvaerner Fjellstrand.
TriCat : 45m length, 602 tonnes, 328/333 passengers catamaran. Propelled by waterjets powered by twin Caterpillar Solar Taurus gas turbines. Cruising speed at 45 knots, capable of 52 knots when empty.  Built by FBM Marine of the United Kingdom for universal MK 2001–2008 only (Note: Universal MK 2009 and 2010 are built by Pequot River of the USA). Universal MK 2001–2005 are installed with 2 shorter chimneys at the back while Universal MK 2006–2010 are installed with 2 higher chimneys at the back of the vessels.)
JetFoil: 24.44m length, 267 tonnes, 190/243 passengers monohull hydrofoil. Propelled by waterjets powered by twin Rolls-Royce Allison 501KF gas turbines. Maximum speed at 45 knots. Built by Boeing.
PS-30: 27.8m length, 303 tonnes, 260 passengers Jetfoil-like monohull hydrofoil. Propelled by waterjets powered by twin Rolls-Royce Allison 501KF gas turbines. Maximum speed at 45 knots. Built by Shanghai Simno Marine Limited, under licenses from Boeing. (This vessel is currently inactive as of September 2011.)
Austal 48: 47.5m length, 610 tonnes, 418 passengers catamaran. Propelled by waterjets powered by quadruple MTU 16V 4000 diesel engines, rated at 2320 kW each. Cruising speed at 43.5 knots, capable of 49 knots when empty. Built by Austal Shipyard of Australia.

Rented vessels (returned in December 2008)
Wavemaster SuperFast 39m: 39m length, 300 passengers catamaran. Propelled by waterjets powered by twin MTU 8V 396 diesel engines, rated at 1580 kW each. Maximum speed at 36 knots. Built by Wavemaster International Proprietary Limited Company.
Wavemaster SuperFast 42m: 42m length, 385 passengers catamaran. Propelled by waterjets powered by twin MTU 16V 396 diesel engines, rated at 1960 kW each. Maximum speed at 48 knots. Built by Wavemaster International Proprietary Limited Company.

Vessels information

References

External links

 The official web site of TurboJET
 OMC TurboJet engine Community & Forum
 BarcaFerry

Shenzhen
Shipping companies of Hong Kong
Water transport in Hong Kong
Water transport in Macau
Privately held companies of China
Transport companies established in 1962
Hong Kong brands